The 2021 Meistriliiga, also known as A. Le Coq Premium Liiga for sponsorship reasons, was the 31st season of the Meistriliiga, the top Estonian league for association football clubs. The season was scheduled to begin on 5 March 2021, but was delayed due to COVID-19 pandemic until 13 March and concluded on 5 December. 

Flora were the defending champions. The title was decided in the last round match between Flora and FCI Levadia. FCI Levadia drew the game, holding on to their one point lead over Flora and winning their 10th Meistriliiga title, their first since 2014.

Teams
Ten teams were competing in the league, nine clubs from the 2020 season and 2020 Esiliiga champions Vaprus who had earned a promotion after a two-year absence. Vaprus were to be relegated at the end of the 2021 season after finishing in the bottom of the table, however 8th Tulevik chose voluntary relegation to due financial difficulties. Tammeka retained their Meistriliiga spot after winning a relegation playoff against Esiliiga runners-up Tallinna Kalev.

Venues

Personnel and kits

Managerial changes

Format changes
Due to delayed season opening and many postponed matches, the season was shortened. Instead of the regular format of each team playing each of the other teams four times, the league table will be split after the third playthrough (27th match) into two sections of top 6 and bottom 4, with each team playing each other in that section.

League table

Relegation play-offs
At season's end Tammeka, the ninth place club, participated in a two-legged play-off with the runners-up (of independent teams) of the 2021 Esiliiga, for the spot in 2022 Meistriliiga.

Tammeka won 3–0 on aggregate and retained their Meistriliiga spot for the 2022 season.

Results
A total of four rounds will be played. In the first three rounds teams play each other three times. In the fourth round the league was split into 2 groups – top 6, and bottom 4, where they play each team in their group one more time.

Rounds 1–18
Teams play each other twice, once at home and once away.

Rounds 19–27
Teams play each other once, either home or away.

Top six rounds 28–32
Teams play each other once, either home or away.

Bottom four rounds 28–30
Teams play each other once, either home or away.

Statistics

Top goalscorers

Hat-tricks 

Notes4Player scored four goals(H) – Home team(A) – Away team

Awards

Monthly awards

References

External links
Official website

Meistriliiga seasons
1
Estonia
Estonia
Meistriliiga, 2021